Giovanni Attilio Arnolfini (Lucca, 15 October 1733 – 21 November 1791) was an Italian hydrologist and writer.

He was born in Lucca, where he became senator. He was involved in canals and draining of bogs in Lucca and Tuscany. He was hired by Cardinal Ignazio Buoncompagni to complete some works in Lazio.

References

1733 births
1791 deaths
18th-century Italian writers
18th-century Italian male writers
Italian engineers
People from Lucca